Whiteleaf manzanita may refer to either of two plant species of the genus Arctostaphylos:

Arctostaphylos manzanita
Arctostaphylos viscida